Caron Liza Geary (born 15 October 1963 in Paddington, London), known by various stage names, is an English female raggamuffin toaster. She was the first white female reggae/dancehall MC.

According to Geary, her first recorded appearance was on a cover of "Kid Ralph", a dancehall track by Little Twitch. The song talks about a "legendary" homosexual figure in Jamaica's prison system. She has subsequently worked as a solo artist and with other musicians, including Erasure and Boy George, who described her music as "the dirtiest 'slackest' reggae I'd heard since the seventies".

Background
Growing up in Marylebone, Geary lived adjacent to an after-hours party which blasted out reggae music; as a result, Geary was exposed to reggae from a very young age. It is these experiences which inspired her to write the controversial song "Everything Starts with an 'E'" as part of E-Zee Possee, which was banned by the BBC because of its lyrics and made No. 69 in the UK Singles Chart in 1989, leaving the chart after only one week; however it was re-released less than a year later in March 1990 and climbed to No. 15 on the UK chart, spending eight weeks in the chart.

Kinky's first solo single, the Apollo 440 produced "Get Over It", reached No. 95 on the UK Singles Chart. Her only solo top 75 hit, coming five years later, was Everybody, released under the name "Kinky", which charted at No. 71 on that chart.

Kinky has been touring underground, occasionally providing vocals for other artists. In 1997, she took a residency in Ibiza as "the Infidel", operating under the name for a week before writing an album called Cantankerous and taking up the name for herself. When a member of staff at Club Motherfucker described her sound as "feral pop", she became "Feral" and finally ended up with "Feral a.k.a. MC Kinky" and "FERALisKINKY"

Artistry
Descriptions of Geary's sound have varied from a "bass driven, vitriolic sonic hybrid of grimy electronic ragga, manic house and punk rock" to a "white female raggamuffin toaster". Kinky has denounced these descriptions, saying "I can't be bothered with people who spend large amounts of time trying to place people and music into small and narrow categories. I do what comes naturally to me, and it usually has a combination of influences."

Discography

Singles

Solo singles

As featured artist

Other songs

References

External links
Official website
YouTube channel

1963 births
Living people
English women rappers
British reggae musicians
British dancehall musicians
People from Paddington
People from Marylebone
Rappers from London
Singers from London
20th-century English musicians
21st-century English musicians
20th-century English women singers
20th-century English singers
21st-century English women musicians